God Is the Bigger Elvis is a 2011 documentary film about actress Dolores Hart, who abandoned her successful career at the age of 24 to become a Benedictine nun. The film was nominated for the 2012 Academy Award for Best Documentary (Short Subject).

In 1957, Dolores Hart co-starred with Elvis Presley in the Paramount motion picture Loving You. It was in this film that she kissed Elvis. This was Elvis' very first on-screen kiss in a movie. Both Dolores and Elvis would reunite the following year in Michael Curtiz's King Creole.

Awards

References

External links

God Is the Bigger Elvis at HBO
God Is the Bigger Elvis on YouTube

2011 films
2011 short documentary films
American short documentary films
Documentary films about actors
Films about Catholic nuns
2010s English-language films
2010s American films